Crisis Hotline: Veterans Press 1 is a 2013 documentary film about the Veterans' Crisis Line, directed by Ellen Goosenberg Kent and produced by Dana Perry. The film was edited by Geof Bartz, A.C.E and co-edited by Gladys Mae Murphy. The cinematography was done by Tony Hardmon. It won the Academy Award for Best Documentary (Short Subject) at the 87th Academy Awards.

Synopsis
The film focuses on the employees who staff the United States Department of Veterans Affairs suicide hotline in Canandaigua, New York.  The 44-minute documentary shows the emotional strain the job has on employees (many of whom are veterans, former service members, or military family members), and the deep compassion and devotion they have for veterans in a time of crisis.

Awards and nominations

References

External links
 Crisis Hotline: Veterans Press 1 on HBO
 

2013 films
2013 short documentary films
Best Documentary Short Subject Academy Award winners
Documentary films about veterans
American short documentary films
United States Department of Veterans Affairs
Films shot in New York (state)
Documentary films about suicide
2010s English-language films
Films directed by Ellen Goosenberg Kent
2010s American films